Bhagwan Mahaveer College of Engineering and Management (BMCEM) now merge in Mahavir Swami Institute of Technology MVSIT is a private Jain minority college affiliated with Guru Gobind Singh Indraprastha University and located in Jagdishpur, Haryana. MVSIT  is recognised as unaided private institution by AICTE. Admission to MVSIT is through the Common Entrance Test (CET) /JEEMAINS conducted by Guru Gobind Singh Indraprastha University/NTA. The institute offers B.Tech full-time degree programmes.

References

Universities and colleges in Haryana
Colleges of the Guru Gobind Singh Indraprastha University
Engineering colleges in Haryana